The pavane is a slow Renaissance dance.

Pavane may also refer to:
 musical compositions related to the dance such as:
 Pavane, a composition for orchestra and optional chorus by the French composer Gabriel Fauré
 Pavane pour une infante défunte, a composition by the French composer Maurice Ravel
 The Battle Pavane, a composition by Tielman Susato
 Pavane (novel), an alternate history science fiction novel by Keith Roberts